Harry Meiggs Wolter (July 11, 1884 – July 7, 1970) was a professional baseball player. He played all or part of seven seasons in Major League Baseball for the Cincinnati Reds (1907), Pittsburgh Pirates (1907), St. Louis Cardinals (1907), Boston Red Sox (1909), New York Highlanders/Yankees (1910–13) and Chicago Cubs (1917), primarily as an outfielder.

Playing career
Wolter began his playing career after graduating from Santa Clara University in 1906. In seven major league seasons, Wolter played in 588 games and had 1,907 at bats, 286 runs, 514 hits, 69 doubles, 42 triples, 12 home runs, 167 RBI, 95 stolen bases, 268 walks, .270 batting average, .365 on-base percentage, .369 slugging percentage, 703 total bases and 56 sacrifice hits.

On April 20, 1912 he got the first ever hit at Fenway Park.

As a pitcher, Wolter had a 4–6 win–loss record in 15 games, 9 as a starter, with 1 complete game, 5 games finished, 84 innings pitched, 96 hits allowed, 40 runs allowed, 35 earned runs allowed, 1 home run allowed, 50 walks allowed, 29 strikeouts, 6 hit batsmen, 3 wild pitches, 338 batters faced, a 3.75 ERA and a 1.738 WHIP.

Following his playing career, he coached baseball at Stanford University for 26 years, in 1916, from 1923 to 1943, and again from 1946 to 1949.

He died in Palo Alto, California at the age of 85.

References

External links

1884 births
1970 deaths
Major League Baseball outfielders
Cincinnati Reds players
Pittsburgh Pirates players
St. Louis Cardinals players
Boston Red Sox players
New York Highlanders players
New York Yankees players
Chicago Cubs players
San Jose (minor league baseball) players
Seattle Siwashes players
Fresno Raisin Eaters players
San Jose Prune Pickers players
Los Angeles Angels (minor league) players
Sacramento Senators players
Salt Lake City Bees players
San Francisco Seals (baseball) players
Seattle Rainiers players
Logan Collegians players
Minor league baseball managers
Santa Clara Broncos baseball coaches
Stanford Cardinal baseball coaches
Sportspeople from Monterey, California
Baseball players from California